One Man Army is the sixth studio album by Finnish folk metal band Ensiferum. It was released on 20 February 2015 through Metal Blade. It is the band's last album to feature keyboardist Emmi Silvennoinen.

Track listing

Personnel
Petri Lindroos - harsh vocals, guitar, backing vocals
Markus Toivonen - guitar, clean vocals, backing vocals
Sami Hinkka - bass guitar, clean vocals, backing vocals
Janne Parviainen - drums
Emmi Silvennoinen - keyboards, hammond, grand piano, vocals

Additional musicians
 Netta Skog - clean vocals on #11, additional vocals, accordion
 Miitri Aaltonen - vocals on #14
 Jukka-Pekka Miettinen - additional vocals, choirs
 Frederik - additional vocals on #08
 Heri Joensen - speech on #03
 Matti Häkämies - speech on #09, 10
 Olli Haavisto - pedal steel guitar
 Lassi Logrén - nyckelharpa
 Timo Väänänen - kantele
 Manu Lohi - whistle duo on #08
 Mirko P. Mustonen - whistle duo on #08, choirs
 Tanja Varha - choirs
 Bianca Hösli - choirs
 Heidi Parviainen - choirs
 Tuomas Nieminen - choirs
 Petteri Lehikoinen - choirs
 Tapio Kuosma - choirs
 Jukka Hoffrén - choirs
 Toni Salminen - choirs
 Skid - choirs

Trivia
"Neito Pohjolan" means "Lady Of The North"

References

2015 albums
Ensiferum albums